Eutretosoma kovacsi is a species of tephritid or fruit flies in the genus Eutretosoma of the family Tephritidae.

Distribution
Ethiopia.

References

Tephritinae
Insects described in 1941
Diptera of Africa